The following is a list of current and past production automobiles (including pickup trucks, SUVs, and vans) carrying the Dodge brand name.

Current production models

Note: The Charger and Challenger models will be discontinued in 2023.

Former production models

Cars
1910
 Dodge 30-35 (1914–1916)
1920
 Dodge Fast Four (1927–1928)
1930
 Dodge D5/D6/D7 (1937)
 Dodge D8/D9/D10 (1938)
1940
 Dodge Custom (1946–1948)
 Dodge Deluxe (1946–1948)
 Dodge Kingsway (Canada 1946–1952)
 Dodge Regent (Canada 1946–1959)
 Dodge Wayfarer (1949–1952)
 Dodge Meadowbrook (1949–1954)
 Dodge Coronet (1949–1959, 1965–1976, see also 1955–1957 Dodge and Dodge Super Bee)
1950
 Dodge Crusader (Canada 1951–1958)
 Dodge Mayfair (Canada 1953–1959)
 Dodge Royal (1954–1959, see also 1955–1957 Dodge)
 Dodge La Femme (1955–1956)
 Dodge Regal Lancer (1955–1956)
 Dodge Royal Lancer (1955–1957)
 Dodge Custom Royal (1955–1959)
 Dodge Custom Royal Lancer (1955–1959)
 Dodge D-500 (1956)
 Dodge Sierra (1957–1959, see also 1955–1957 Dodge)
 Dodge Suburban (1957–1959, see also 1955–1957 Dodge)
 Dodge Silver Challenger (1959, see also Dodge Coronet)
 Dodge Viscount (Canada 1959)
1960
 Dodge Matador (1960)
 Dodge Savoy (Mexico, rebadged Plymouth Savoy, 1960–1961
 Dodge Phoenix (Australia, 1960–1973)
 Dodge Polara (1960–1973)
 Dodge Dart (1960–1976)
 Dodge Lancer (1961–1962, 1985–1989)
 Dodge Custom 880 (1962–1965) 
 Dodge 330 (1963–1964)
 Dodge 440 (1963–1964)
 Dodge Monaco (1965–1978, 1990–1992)
 Dodge Charger (B-body) (1966–1978)
 Dodge Super Bee (1968–1971)
 Dodge Charger Daytona (1969, 1975–1977, 2006–2009, 2013, 2017, 2020)
1970
 Dodge Demon (1971–1972)
 Dodge 1500/1800 (Argentina/Colombia/Brazil, rebadged Hillman Avenger, 1971–1981)
 Dodge Colt (1971–1994 as rebadged Mitsubishi Chariot, Galant, Mirage and Lancer models)
 Dodge SE (South Africa, rebadged Chrysler Valiant (VH), 1973)
 Dodge Lancer Celeste (rebadged Mitsubishi Lancer (A70), 1975–1981)
 Dodge Aspen (1976–1980)
 Dodge Arrow (Canada)(Mitsubishi Lancer A70)(1976-1981)
 Dodge Alpine (Colombia, rebadged Simca 1307, 1977–1982)
 Dodge Diplomat (1977–1989)
 Dodge Colt Challenger (rebadged Mitsubishi Galant Lambda, 1978–1983)
 Dodge Omni (1978–1990)
 Dodge Magnum (1978–1979, 2005–2008)
 Dodge St. Regis (1979–1981)
 Dodge Omni 024 (1979–1982)
1980
 Dodge Mirada (1980–1983)
 Dodge Aries (1981–1989)
 Dodge 400 (1982–1983)
 Dodge Charger (L-body) (1983–1987)
 Dodge 600 (1983–1988)
 Dodge Colt Vista (rebadged Mitsubishi Chariot, 1983–1991)
 Dodge Conquest (1984–1986 as rebadged Mitsubishi Starion)
 Dodge Daytona (1984–1993)
 Dodge Shadow (1987–1994)
 Dodge Dynasty (1988–1993)
 Dodge Spirit (1989–1995)
1990
 Dodge Stealth (1991–1996 as rebadged Mitsubishi GTO)
 Dodge Viper (1992–2017)
 Dodge Intrepid (1993–2004)
 Dodge Stratus (1995–2006)
 Dodge Avenger (1995–2000, 2008–2014)
 Dodge Vision (Mexico, rebadged Fiat Siena, 1996–2018
 Dodge Atos (Mexico, rebadged Hyundai Atos, 1997–2014)
 Dodge SX 2.0 (Canada, rebadged Chrysler Neon, 1999–2005)
 Dodge Verna (India, rebadged Hyundai Accent, 1999–2020)
2000
 Dodge Brisa (Venezuela, 2002–2009)
 Dodge Neon SRT-4 (2003–2005)
 Dodge Attitude (Mexico, rebadged Hyundai Accent, 2006–2014)
 Dodge Caliber (2007–2012)
 Dodge i10 (Mexico, rebadged Hyundai i10, 2007–2016)
 Dodge Trazo (South America, rebadged Nissan Tiida, 2009)
2010
 Dodge Dart (PF) (2013–2016)
 Dodge Forza (Venezuela, rebadged Fiat Siena, 2013–2016)

SUVs
1970
 Dodge Ramcharger (1974–1993)
1980
 Dodge Raider (1987–1989 as rebadged Mitsubishi Pajero)
2000
 Dodge Nitro (2007–2012)
 Dodge Journey (2009–2020)

Vans/Minivans
1950
 Dodge Town Panel/Town Wagon (1954–1971)
1970
 Dodge Ram Van/Ram Wagon/Sportsman/Tradesman/B-series van (1971–2003)
 Dodge SpaceVan (Europe, rebadged Commer FC, 1974–1983)
1980
 Dodge Mini Ram Van (1984–1988 as cargo version of Chrysler minivans)
 Dodge Grand Caravan (1984–2020)
 Dodge Caravan (1984–2020)\* Dodge 1000 (Mexico, rebadged Mitsubishi Delica, 1986–2007)
 Dodge 1000 (Mexico, rebadged Mitsubishi Delica, 1986–2007)
2000
 Dodge Sprinter (2003–2009 as rebadged Mercedes-Benz Sprinter)

Trucks
1930
 Dodge 'Job-Rated' (T/V/W-Series) (1939–1947)
1940
 Dodge V/W-Series (military) (1940–1942)
 Dodge Power Wagon (1946–1980, 2003–2009)
 Dodge B Series (1948–1953)
 Dodge 100 "Kew" (Europe, 1949–1957)
1950
 Dodge C Series (1954–1960)
 Dodge 300 series (Europe, 1957–1965)
1960
 Dodge LCF Series (1960–1976)
 Dodge D Series (1961–1988)
 Dodge 500/K series (Europe, 1964–?)
 Dodge A100 (1964–1970)
 Dodge M Series (1968–1979)
1970
 Dodge 100 series (Europe, 1972–1987)
 Dodge Husky (South Africa, rebadged Rootes Arrow, 1975-?)
 Dodge D-50 (1979–1993)
 Dodge Ram 50 (1979–1993)
 Dodge 50 series (Europe, 1979–1993)
1980
 Dodge Rampage (1982–1984)
 Dodge 1000 (Mexico, rebadged Mitsubishi Delica, 1986–2007)
 Dodge Dakota (1987–2011)
2000
 Dodge H-100 (Mexico, rebadged Hyundai Porter)(2003-2020)
 Dodge Ram 3500 (2006-2007)

References

Automobiles
Dodge